Domnall Mór Ua Briain, or Domnall Mór mac Toirrdelbaig Uí Briain, was King of Thomond in Ireland from 1168 to 1194 and a claimant to the title King of Munster. He was also styled King of Limerick, a title belonging to the O'Brien dynasty since Brian Boru's annexation of the Norse city in the 10th century.

History
Domnall Mór ("Donall the Great") was the third son of Toirdhealbhach mac Diarmada Ua Briain, King of Munster, who reigned from 1142 to 1167. He ascended to the throne in 1168 after the death of his eldest brother, Muirchertach, who had succeeded their father as king. Muirchertach was killed at the instigation of his cousin Conchobar mac Muirchertach Ua Briain. His other brother Brian of Slieve Bloom was blinded in 1169. The same year, Domnall entered into conflict with the High King of Ireland, Ruaidrí Ua Conchobair and was forced to pay him a tribute of 300 cows.

In 1171, he submitted to King Henry II of England at Cashel, but he continued to fight successfully against the Norman incursion into southwest Ireland for many years. In 1175, having demolished the Cambro-Normans at the Battle of Thurles, he consolidated his power by blinding two of his cousins, Dermot mac Taig Ua Briain and Mathgamain mac Toirdhelbeach Ua Briain, in Limerick. He was, however, driven from Thomond by Ua Conchobair, the High King, the same year. In 1176, he drove the Normans from Limerick and in 1178 finally drove out the Uí Fidgenti (AI), the ancient rulers of the modern County Limerick region.

In 1184, part of his lands was enfeoffed to Philip de Braose, Lord Deputy of Ireland. Supported by Robert Fitz-Stephen and Miles de Cogan, the Lord Deputy set out to take possession of Limerick, but on approaching the city, turned back in a panic. In 1185 when Prince John of England intervened in Ireland, Domnall Mór demolished the Normans again when John was plundering along the valley of the River Suir. The same year he also blinded the last Dermot brother. In 1188, he helped the men of Connacht under Conchobar Maenmaige Ua Conchobhair to overcome Jean de Courcy in the Curlew Mountains. In 1193, the Normans devastated Clare in reprisal and plundered Domnall's possessions in Ossory.

He established Holy Cross Abbey in 1180 and Kilcooly Abbey in 1184, both under the Cistercian order.

According to the Annals of Ulster, he was the last king of Munster, dying in 1194. It is believed that he is buried within Saint Mary's Cathedral, Limerick, a church he first organised. An ancient stone coffin lid, purportedly that of King Domnall, lies in the Chancel near the high altar.

Family
Domnall Mór married Orlacan, daughter of Diarmait Mac Murchada and Sadb Ní Faeláin. He left three sons and one daughter. His sons fought amongst themselves and with their cousin Muichertach, son of Brian of Slieve Bloom, for the succession in Thomond.

Muirchertach Dall (King of Thomond, 1194-1198, restored 1202 or 1203-1208 or 1210, blinded 1208 or 1210, died 1239)
Conchobar Ruadh (King of Thomond, 1198-1202 or 1203, killed 1202 or 1203)
Donnchadh Cairbreach (King of Thomond, 1208 or 1210–1242)
Mór Ní Briain (Queen Consort of Connaught)
Princess of Thomond who married William de Burgh

Ancestry

See also
 O'Brien dynasty

Sources

12th-century Irish monarchs
1194 deaths
People from County Clare
Kings of Thomond
Domnall
Domnall
Year of birth unknown